Giovanni Giacone (1 December 1900 – 1 April 1964) was an Italian footballer who played as a goalkeeper. He competed in the men's tournament at the 1920 Summer Olympics. He was the first Juventus player to play for the Italy national team when he played on 28 March 1920 in a friendly match; a 3–0 away loss against Switzerland.

References

1900 births
1964 deaths
Italian footballers
Italy international footballers
Olympic footballers of Italy
Footballers at the 1920 Summer Olympics
Footballers from Turin
Association football goalkeepers
Juventus F.C. players
Torino F.C. players